Bussea is a genus of flowering plants in the legume family, Fabaceae.

Species include: 
Bussea eggelingii
Bussea gossweileri	
Bussea massaiensis	
Bussea occidentalis
Bussea perrieri	
Bussea sakalava
Bussea xylocarpa

References

Fabaceae genera
Caesalpinioideae
Taxonomy articles created by Polbot